The E-ninnu 𒂍𒐐 (House of 50) was the E (temple) to the warrior god Ningirsu in the Sumerian city of Girsu in southern Mesopotamia. Girsu was the religious centre of a state that was named Lagash after its most populous city, which lay 25 km (16 mi) southeast of Girsu. Rulers of Lagash who contributed to the structure of the E-ninnu included Ur-Nanshe of Lagash in the late 26th century BC, his grandson Eannatum in the following century, Urukagina in the 24th century and Gudea, ruler of Lagash in the mid 22nd century BC. 

The site has yielded inscribed bricks naming Ur-Nanshe and Eannatum, but most bricks date from the restoration effected by Gudea. The Gudea cylinders, perhaps the longest surviving text written in the Sumerian language, give a semi-mythical account of the building of the temple, along with a description of the rituals and symbols associated with E-ninnu. 

Some form of temple to Ningirsu probably existed from the early days of the city. Sumerian gods were generally associated with particular cities and Ningirsu means "Lord of Girsu". There was also a temple to Ningirsu called the Bagara in the larger nearby city of Lagash, where the rulers of Lagash had their palace.

Excavations 
More than a dozen diorite statues of Gudea were discovered, during French excavations at Girsu in the late 19th and early 20th centuries, in a Hellenistic-era shrine on the Mound of the Palais. The shrine was built by a minor local king, Adad-Nadin-Akhe, to honour Gudea on the site of his temple to Ningirsu, which was then already 2000 years old. Adad-Nadin-Akhe also built a Parthian style palace on the site. The French excavators never realized that the enigmatic E-ninnu they were searching for was directly underneath this shrine, and halted excavations in 1933. Over 80 years later excavators returned to the site under the direction of the British Museum. The head of excavations, Sebastien Rey, was able to finally locate the temple in 2016 and has led several seasons of excavation at the site. In February 2023, archaeologists from theBritish Museum and Getty Museum identified the E-ninnu temple alongside the remains of the 4,500 year-old Sumerian Lord Palace of the Kings and more than 200 cuneiform tablets containing administrative records of Girsu.

Gallery

References

Ancient Near East temples
Mesopotamian religion